Barauli is a village in the Jaunpur district of Uttar Pradesh, India. Bhojpuri is the traditional language of this village.

References

Villages in Jaunpur district